The Palace at 4 a.m. is a 1932 surrealist sculpture by Alberto Giacometti.

Palace at 4 A.M. may also refer to:
The Palace at 4 a.m. (Part I), a 2002 album by Jay Bennett and Edward Burch
The Palace at 4 A.M., a 1972 play by Howard Moss
"The Palace at Four A.M.", a 1983 short story by Donald Barthelme
Palace at 4 A.M., a 2005 art installation by Jon Kessler
"The Palace at 4 AM", a 2009 song by A. C. Newman

See also
Palace (disambiguation)